Serpotortella is a genus of haplolepideous mosses (Dicranidae) in the monotypic family Serpotortellaceae in the order Pottiales.

Species

Two species are recognised:

Serpotortella chenagonii 
Serpotortella cyrtophylla

References

Moss genera
Pottiales